The 1984–85 Cypriot Second Division was the 30th season of the Cypriot second-level football league. Ermis Aradippou FC won their 2nd title.

Format
Fourteen teams participated in the 1984–85 Cypriot Second Division. All teams played against each other twice, once at their home and once away. The team with the most points at the end of the season crowned champions. The first two teams were promoted to 1985–86 Cypriot First Division. The last two teams were relegated to the 1985–86 Cypriot Third Division.

Changes from previous season
Teams promoted to 1984–85 Cypriot First Division
 Olympiakos Nicosia
 Evagoras Paphos

Teams relegated from 1983–84 Cypriot First Division
 Ethnikos Achna FC
 Ermis Aradippou FC

Teams promoted from 1983–84 Cypriot Third Division
 Adonis Idaliou
 Akritas Chlorakas

Teams relegated to 1984–85 Cypriot Third Division
 AEM Morphou
 Kentro Neotitas Maroniton

League standings

See also
 Cypriot Second Division
 1984–85 Cypriot First Division
 1984–85 Cypriot Cup

References

Cypriot Second Division seasons
Cyprus
1984–85 in Cypriot football